Österreich II   is an Austrian television series.

See also
List of Austrian television series

External links
 

1982 Austrian television series debuts
1995 Austrian television series endings
1980s Austrian television series
1990s Austrian television series
ORF (broadcaster)
German-language television shows